Leonardo Fernández may refer to:

Leonardo Fernández (Bolivian footballer) (Leonardo Alberto Fernández Napollitano)
Leonardo Carlos Fernández, Argentine retired and manager
Leonardo Fernández (Uruguayan footballer) (Leonardo Cecilio Fernández López)